Dancing with the Stars is a Greek dance competition television series that premiered on March 28, 2010, on ANT1 and filmed live in Athens. The show aired until February 1, 2015, on ANT1. On January 26, 2018 ANT1 premiered the sixth season and aired until May 4, 2018. The show returned from Star Channel. The show is based on the British BBC Television series Strictly Come Dancing and is part of BBC Worldwide's Dancing with the Stars franchise. The theme song is "It's personal" performed by Swedish indie pop band The Radio Dept.

The format of the show consists of a celebrity paired with a professional dancer. Each couple performs predetermined dances and competes against the others for judges' points and audience votes. The couple receiving the lowest combined total of judges' points and audience votes is eliminated each week until only the champion dance pair remains.

Cast

Hosts

Since its premiere in 2010, the show was hosted by Zeta Makripoulia. In the fourth season Makripoulia was replaced by Doukissa Nomikou. The sixth season was hosted by Evangelia Aravani. There was also a different co-host in each season for the backstage room, also known as Green Room. The co-hosts included Eleni Karpontini (first season) and Mary Sinatsaki (second season). Argiris Aggelou, the winner of the second season, co-hosted the third season, Ntoretta Papadimitriou, the winner of the third season, co-hosted the fourth season and Kostas Martakis, the runner-up of the second season, co-hosted the fifth season. Savvas Poumpouras co-hosted the sixth season.

On April 15, 2021 it was announced that model Vicky Kaya, will be hosting the seventh season of the show, which began airing on Star Channel in the television season 2021–2022. Lambros Fisfis was the co-host for the backstage room.

Judges
Giannis Latsios, Fokas Evaggelinos, Galena Velikova-Chaina and Alexis Kostalas were the judges of the first season. In the second season, Errica Prezerakou, the winner of the first season, replaced Velikova-Chaina. In the third season, Prezerakou was replaced by Katia Dandoulaki and Velikova-Chaina returned.

In the fourth season, all the judges from season 3 returned except for Evaggelinos, while Giorgos Liagkas, Eugenia Manolidou and Themos Anastasiadis were guest judges for the 4th, 8th and 9th week respectively. In the fifth season all the judges from season 4 returned. Lakis Gavalas is the fifth judge in fifth season.

In the sixth season Kostalas and Velikova returned as judges, while Giorgos Liagas and, former contestant, Eleonora Meleti joined the judging panel. Throughout the season, various guest judges appeared as the fifth judge in the judging panel for one episode.

The four new judges in the seventh season, that aired on Star Channel, were Stefanos Dimoulas, Marina Lampropoulou, Elena Lizardou and Jason Roditis.

Couples 
A total of 100 celebrities have appeared during the 7 seasons of the series. Twelve celebrities participated in the first season, 14 in the second, third, fourth and fifth season and 16 in the sixth, seventh season. Also, a total of 49 professional partners have appeared alongside celebrities, some for only one season.

Professional partners 
Bold font indicates that the dancer is a participant in the present season.

Color key:
 Winner
 Runner-up
 3rd place

List of dance

Highest-scoring celebrities

Number of perfect scores

Series overview

References

External links
Official website of Dancing with the Stars Greece

 
ANT1 original programming
Greek reality television series
Greek music television series
2010 Greek television series debuts
2015 Greek television series endings
2010s Greek television series
Greek television series based on British television series